When Love Comes is a 1922 American silent drama film directed by William A. Seiter and starring Helen Jerome Eddy, Harrison Ford and Fanny Midgley.

Cast
 Helen Jerome Eddy as Jane Coleridge
 Harrison Ford as Peter Jamison
 Fanny Midgley as Aunt Susie Coleridge 
 Claire Du Brey as Marie Jamison
 Joseph Bell as Jim Matthews
 Gilbert Clayton as Rufus Terrence
 Buddy Messinger as Coleridge Twin 
 Molly Gordon as Coleridge Twin
 James O. Barrows as David Coleridge 
 Fay McKenzie as Ruth

References

Bibliography
 Munden, Kenneth White. The American Film Institute Catalog of Motion Pictures Produced in the United States, Part 1. University of California Press, 1997.

External links
 

1922 films
1922 drama films
1920s English-language films
American silent feature films
Silent American drama films
American black-and-white films
Films directed by William A. Seiter
Film Booking Offices of America films
1920s American films